Kattathur may refer to any of the following villages in Ariyalur district, Tamil Nadu, India:

 Kattathur (North)
 Kattathur (South)